Alipumilio is a South American genus of 12 species of hoverfly. Where known these flies breed in sap flowing from trees, examples having been reared from the sap of Araucaria.

Species
A. athesphatus Thompson, 2009
A. avispas Vockeroth, 1964
A. femoratus Shannon, 1927
A. nigrocoeruleus Vockeroth, 1964
A. pullatus Vockeroth, 1964

References

External links

Diptera of South America
Hoverfly genera
Eumerini